Tortita negra (little black cake) is an Argentinean pastry which is flat at its base and round on the sides. Traditionally they have dark brown sugar on the top. They are eaten in Argentina, Colombia and Venezuela. In Argentina they are very popular amongst other “facturas” (Argentinean pastries) and are usually the perfect accompaniment of mate in the morning or in the afternoon during ‘tea time’. They are a popular food at children's parties in Colombia.

Recipe
The recipe includes flour, salt, butter, and milk, and a covering of dark brown sugar. The name comes from the natural color of the dark brown sugar.

References

Argentine pastries
Venezuelan pastries